Atiba Erasto Harris (born 9 January 1985) is a Kittitian football administrator and former professional footballer. He captained the Saint Kitts and Nevis national team.

As of August 2021, he serves as President of the St. Kitts and Nevis Football Association.

Career

Club 
Harris played for St. Peters FC as a youngster, captaining them to the SKNFA Premier League Finals, and became the first player from St. Kitts to sign with a Spanish club when he signed in Spain with Cádiz in 2004–05.

In 2006, he became the first St. Kitts player to sign with Major League Soccer. He signed with Salt Lake and scored four goals and recorded one assist in 12 starts.

In December 2007, Harris was traded to Chivas USA for a third-round pick in the 2008 SuperDraft. After a season and a half with Chivas USA, the Goats traded Harris in July 2009 to FC Dallas in exchange for Marcelo Saragosa. Harris ended his Chivas USA career with 42 appearances, 5 goals, and 7 assists.

On 12 September 2009, in a match against Los Angeles Galaxy, Harris scored his first goal with FC Dallas off a Dax McCarty cross. He went on to score another goal vs Seattle finishing the season with two goals and five assists for FC Dallas and four goals and seven assists overall for the 2009 MLS season. Harris was a key player for Dallas in 2010 scoring four goals during the season and helping the club reach its first MLS Cup final.

He was selected by the Vancouver Whitecaps FC in the 2011 MLS Expansion Draft. Harris suffered an injury and missed most of the 2011 season. He stayed with Vancouver throughout the 2012 season before being traded to Colorado Rapids in December 2012 in exchange for an international roster spot.

After one season in Colorado Harris was traded to San Jose Earthquakes in January 2014 in exchange for Marvin Chávez.

Harris stayed one season in San Jose before entering the 2014 MLS Re-Entry Draft in December 2014. He was selected in stage two of the draft by FC Dallas. During his second stint in Dallas, head coach Óscar Pareja mostly used Harris as a right fullback.

International 

Harris has played for the Saint Kitts and Nevis national team since 2003 and served as team captain. He played in five of St. Kitts' 2006 FIFA World Cup qualifying games, and in its 2010 FIFA World Cup qualifying game against Belize on 6 February 2008.

Post-playing career 

In May 2021, following his retirement from playing, Harris declared his candidacy for president of the St. Kitts and Nevis Football Association, which he won on 29 August.

Career statistics

International goals 
Scores and results list Saint Kitts and Nevis's goal tally first.

Personal life 

Harris is from Monkey Hill, Saint Kitts. He is the son of Sonia Williams of Gingerland, Nevis, and Egbert Harris of St. Peter's, St. Kitts. He has two older sisters along with a younger brother, Kareem Harris, who is also a footballer. He and his wife Rachael Harris have four daughters.

He is the cousin of English former footballer Micah Richards.

Honours 

FC Dallas
 Western Conference
 Playoffs: 2010
 Regular Season: 2015, 2016
 Supporters' Shield: 2016
 Lamar Hunt U.S. Open Cup: 2016

Legacy 

On 14 February 2020, the sporting facility in his hometown St. Peter's was renamed the Atiba Erasto Harris Sporting Complex. This facility hosts a football field along with both a basketball and a netball court. On 29 August 2021, Harris became the youngest president of the SKNFA at the age of 36.

References

External links 

1985 births
Living people
People from Basseterre
Saint Kitts and Nevis footballers
Saint Kitts and Nevis expatriate footballers
Saint Kitts and Nevis international footballers
Cádiz CF players
CD Linares players
Real Salt Lake players
Chivas USA players
FC Dallas players
Vancouver Whitecaps FC players
Colorado Rapids players
San Jose Earthquakes players
OKC Energy FC players
Murciélagos FC footballers
Expatriate footballers in Mexico
Expatriate soccer players in the United States
Expatriate soccer players in Canada
Major League Soccer players
Association football wingers
Association football defenders
Saint Kitts and Nevis expatriate sportspeople in Canada
Saint Kitts and Nevis expatriate sportspeople in Mexico
Saint Kitts and Nevis expatriate sportspeople in the United States
USL Championship players